While some viruses did exist for Palm OS based devices, very few were ever designed. Typically, mobile devices are difficult for virus writers to target, since their simplicity provides fewer security holes to target compared to a desktop.

Viruses for Palm OS

References

Palm OS software
Mobile malware